Haliburton—Kawartha Lakes—Brock (formerly Haliburton—Victoria—Brock and Victoria—Haliburton) is a federal electoral district in central Ontario, Canada, that has been represented in the House of Commons of Canada since 1968.

Geography
The district includes the City of Kawartha Lakes, Haliburton County, the Township of Brock, and also the Township of Cavan-Monaghan.

Demographics
According to the Canada 2011 Census; 2013 representation

Ethnic groups: 96.1% White, 2.0% Aboriginal 
Languages: 94.5% English, 1.3% German, 1.2% French 
Religions: 68.1% Christian (21.3% United Church, 15.5% Catholic, 11.1% Anglican, 4.4% Presbyterian, 3.8% Baptist, 2.0% Pentecostal, 1.0% Lutheran, 9.0% Other), 30.8% No religion 
Median income (2010): $28,098 
Average income (2010): $37,231

Riding associations

Riding associations are the local branches of the national political parties:

History
It was created in 1966 as "Victoria—Haliburton" from parts of Victoria, Peterborough and Hastings—Frontenac and  ridings.

It consisted initially of
 in the County of Hastings: the Townships of Bangor, Carlow, Herschel, McClure, Monteagle and Wicklow;
 the County of Haliburton;
 in the County of Ontario: the Townships of Brock, Mara, Rama and Thorah, the islands in Lake Couchiching belonging to Rama Indian Reserve No. 32, but excluding all islands belonging to Georgina Island Indian Reserve No. 33;
 in the County of Peterborough: the Townships of Anstruther, Burleigh, Cavendish, Chandos, Galway and Harvey;
 the County of Victoria.

In 1976, the Township of Manvers in the county of Victoria, all parts of the county of Hastings, all townships other than the Township of Brock) in the Regional Municipality of Durham (formerly the County of Ontario) were excluded from the riding, and the Township of Georgina in the Regional Municipality of York was added.

In 1987, the riding was redefined to consist of the counties of Haliburton and Victoria, the Township of Brock in the Regional Municipality of Durham,
and, in the County of Peterborough, the Village of Millbrook and the townships of Burleigh and Anstruther, Cavan, Chandos, Galway and Cavendish, and Harvey.

In 1996, it was redefined to consist of the County of Victoria, the Township of Brock in the Regional Municipality of Durham, the County of Haliburton (excluding the townships of Sherborne, McClintock, Livingstone, Lawrence and Nightingale), and the part of the County of Peterborough lying north of and including the townships of Burleigh and Anstruther, Chandos and Harvey, including the Village of Millbrook and the Township of Cavan.

The name of the electoral district was changed in 1998 to "Haliburton—Victoria—Brock".

The name of the electoral district was changed in 2003 when Victoria County became the city of Kawartha Lakes. The boundaries were slightly altered to what they are today.

In 2013, the federal redistribution saw slight changes to the riding which removed the County of Peterborough Townships of Trent Lakes and North Kawartha. Both of these townships were placed in the new riding of Peterborough-Kawartha. These changes will first be used for the 2015 Federal Election.

Member of Parliament

This riding has elected the following Members of Parliament:

Election results

 	

Note: Conservative vote is compared to the total of the Canadian Alliance vote and Progressive Conservative vote in 2000 election.
					

Note: Canadian Alliance vote is compared to the Reform vote in 1997 election.

Note: the popular vote for Canadian Action Party candidate Charles Olito is compared to his vote as a Canada Party candidate in the 1993 election.

See also
 List of Canadian federal electoral districts
 Past Canadian electoral districts

References

Riding history from the Library of Parliament.
2011 Results from Elections Canada
 Campaign expense data from Elections Canada

Notes

Ontario federal electoral districts
Kawartha Lakes